Hesar-e Kuchek (also Romanized as Ḩeşār-e Kūchek, Ḩeşār Kūchek, Ḩeşār-e Kūchak, and Hisār Kuchik; also known as Ḩeşār-e Soflá) is a village in Behnamarab-e Jonubi Rural District, Javadabad District, Varamin County, Tehran Province, Iran. At the 2006 census, its population was 90, in 24 families.

References 

Populated places in Varamin County